The Experiment on Rapidly Intensifying Cyclones over the Atlantic, or ERICA, is a scientific field project that started in the winter of 1988/1989. Its aims were to better understand the processes involved in rapid cyclogenesis, and so improve understanding and forecasting of the situations that cause it.

See also 
RAINEX

References

Meteorology research and field projects